Vinkeveen en Waverveen is a former municipality in the Dutch province of Utrecht. It was created in a merger of Vinkeveen and Waverveen in 1841, and existed until 1989, when the new municipality of De Ronde Venen was formed.

References

Former municipalities of Utrecht (province)
De Ronde Venen